Pyrota fasciata is a species of blister beetle in the family Meloidae. It is found in Central America and North America.

It measures between 10 and 21 mm, although most specimens have a length below 15 mm. It is identifiable thanks to its uniform background shell color, which differs from other species such as the Pyrota punctata, which has a 2-toned shell background.

References

Further reading

 
 
 

Meloidae
Articles created by Qbugbot
Beetles described in 1963